Xscape may refer to:

Business
 Xscape, a chain of arcades owned by Cineplex Entertainment in Canada
Xscape (building), a chain of indoor ski slope/leisure complexes in the United Kingdom

Music
Xscape (vocal group), an  American/R&B band popular in the 1990s
Xscape (album), a 2014 album by Michael Jackson

Other
Xscape Match, a match type in professional wrestling
X-Scape, a DSiWare game that is the sequel to the 1992 Game Boy game, X

See also
 Escape (disambiguation)